Loch Achtriochtan or Loch Trychardan is a small shallow freshwater loch located to the east of Glencoe village in Lochaber in the Scottish Highlands. It is now under the care  of the National Trust for Scotland. During the 18th century, the loch flooded and nearby inhabitants had to abandon the area.

Topography
Loch Achtriochtan is a small fresh water lochan in Glencoe, fed by the River Coe, which eventually flows into Loch Leven at Invercoe. To the south of the Loch is Achnambeithach Cottage, accessible from the A82 road. To the north, there are the mountains Sgorr nam Fiannaidh and Stob Coire Leith and, to the south, the Three Sisters. Loch Actriochtan sits about three miles from Glencoe village.

References

See also

 Glen Coe
 Glencoe, Highland
 Three Sisters (Glen Coe)

Achtriochtan
Lochaber
Achtriochtan